This is a list of amusement rides based on specific television shows or franchises.

† - Has since closed in that particular location.

See also
List of amusement rides based on film franchises
List of IMAX-based rides
List of amusement rides based on video games franchises

References

Amusement rides based on television franchises
Television franchises
A